Fernando Antonio Cárdenas Arredondo (born 30 April 1988) is a Colombian footballer who currently plays for Independiente Santa Fe.

Career
Cárdenas began his youth career with Deportivo Pereira and made his first team debut with the club in 2008. After two seasons with Deportivo, he was sent on loan to Once Caldas and played for the club in the 2010 Copa Libertadores. After his stay with Once Caldas he was sent on loan to Deportes Tolima for the second half of the 2010 season. In 2011, he returned to Deportivo Pereira where his form in the first half of the campaign led to interest from top Colombian side América de Cali. The diminutive left-footed attacker than signed with América for the 2011 Finalización.

On 9 January 2012, it was announced that Cárdenas and former América teammate John Jairo Lozano would be joining New England Revolution in Major League Soccer.

Teams

References

External links
 
 

1988 births
Living people
Colombian footballers
América de Cali footballers
Once Caldas footballers
New England Revolution players
Major League Soccer players
Deportivo Pereira footballers
Deportes Tolima footballers
Independiente Santa Fe footballers
Categoría Primera A players
Colombian expatriate footballers
Expatriate soccer players in the United States
Association football midfielders
Association football forwards
Sportspeople from Valle del Cauca Department